Soyuz is a transliteration of the Cyrillic text Союз (Russian and Ukrainian, 'Union'). It can refer to any union, such as a trade union (profsoyuz) or the Union of Soviet Socialist Republics (Сою́з Сове́тских Социалисти́ческих Респу́блик, Soyuz Sovetskikh Sotsialisticheskikh Respublik). As terminological shorthand "soyuz" by itself was often used interchangeably with each of the slightly longer terms Сове́тский Сою́з (Sovetskiy Soyuz, 'Soviet Union'). It was also a shorthand for the citizenry as a whole.

Soyuz is also the designated name of various projects the country commissioned during the Space Race.

Space program uses 

 Soyuz programme, a human spaceflight program initiated by the Soviet Union, continued by the Russian Federation
 Soyuz (spacecraft), used in that program
 Soyuz (rocket), initially used to launch that spacecraft
 Soyuz (rocket family), derivatives of that rocket design
 Soyuz Launch Complex in Kourou, French Guiana

Other Soviet/Russian/Ukrainian uses 

 SS Albert Ballin, a 1922 German-built ship recovered and renamed Soyuz by the USSR
 Sovetsky Soyuz-class battleship, an aborted ship construction program, 1938–1941
 Sovetsky Soyuz, a propaganda magazine published by the Soviet Union, beginning in 1956
 Soyuz Station, a base established in 1982 by members of the Soviet Antarctic Expeditions in Mac. Robertson Land
 , a Moscow-based media company, founded in 1988
 Soyuz (faction) in the Congress of Soviets, 1990–1991
 Soyuz (political party), a political party in Ukraine, established in 1997

Uses in fiction 

 Soyuz, a team of Russian superheroes in DC Comics
 Soyuz, a character in Dr. StoneJapanese manga series

See also 

 
 
 

Russian words and phrases
Ukrainian words and phrases